Lewisham London Borough Council is the local authority for the London Borough of Lewisham, in London, United Kingdom. Elections are held every four years using a plurality bloc vote electoral system for the councillors and the supplementary vote electoral system for the elected mayor.

Political control
The first election to the council was held in 1964, initially operating as a shadow authority before the new system came into effect the following year. Political control of the council since 1964 has been held by the following parties:

Leadership
Prior to 2002, political leadership was provided by the leader of the council. The leaders from 1965 to 2002 were:

In 2002 the council changed to having directly-elected mayors. The mayors since 2002 have been:

Council elections
1964 Lewisham London Borough Council election
1968 Lewisham London Borough Council election
1971 Lewisham London Borough Council election
1974 Lewisham London Borough Council election
1978 Lewisham London Borough Council election (boundary changes increased the number of seats by seven)
1982 Lewisham London Borough Council election
1986 Lewisham London Borough Council election
1990 Lewisham London Borough Council election
1994 Lewisham London Borough Council election (boundary changes took place but the number of seats remained the same)
1998 Lewisham London Borough Council election
2002 Lewisham London Borough Council election (boundary changes reduced the number of seats by thirteen) 
2006 Lewisham London Borough Council election
2010 Lewisham London Borough Council election
2014 Lewisham London Borough Council election
2018 Lewisham London Borough Council election
2022 Lewisham London Borough Council election

Borough result maps

By-election results

1964–1968
There were no by-elections.

1968–1971
There were no by-elections.

1971–1974

1974–1978

1978–1982

1982–1986

1986–1990

1990–1994

The by-election was called following the resignation of Cllr. Helen A. H. Dawson.

The by-election was called following the resignation of Cllr. Thomas L. Fowler.

The by-election was called following the resignation of Cllr. Theodore J. B. Yard.

The by-election was called following the death of Cllr. Eric Richards.

The by-election was called following the death of Cllr. Timothy Walsh.

The by-election was called following the resignation of Cllr. Cathy Doyle.

1994–1998

The by-election was called following the resignation of Cllr. Marc O. Morgan-Huws.

The by-election was called following the resignation of Cllr. John Macdonald.

The by-election was called following the death of Cllr. John C. Rudd.

The by-election was called following the resignation of Cllr. Heidi A. Nash.

The by-election was called following the resignation of Cllr. Clive R. Jordan.

The by-election was called following the resignation of Cllr. Margaret Moran.

1998–2002

The by-election was called following the resignation of Cllr. David Brown.

The by-election was called following the resignation of Cllr. Roy T. Stevens.

The by-election was called following the resignation of Cllr. Alan D. Hall.

The by-election was called following the resignation of Cllr. Kelly A. M. Conway.

The by-election was called following the resignation of Cllr. Sandra Margaret.

The by-election was called following the resignation of Cllr. Annette L. Gordon.

The by-election was called following the resignation of Cllr. John A. O’Shea.

2002–2006

The by-election was called following the resignation of Cllr. David Sullivan.

The by-election was called following the resignation of Cllr. Paul J. Fallon.

The by-election was called following the resignation of Cllr. Parmavir Singha.

The by-election was called following the resignation of Cllr. John P. Houghton.

The by-election was called following the resignation of Cllr. Alicia Chater.

The by-election was called following the resignation of Cllr. Rachael J. Collins.

The by-election was called following the death of Cllr. Joseph P. Dawson.

The by-election was called following the resignation of Cllr. Neil Semple.

2006–2010

The by-election was called following the disqualification of Cllr. Sera Kentman.

The by-election was called following the resignations of Cllrs. Simon C. Carter and Mark C. Morris.

2010–2014

The by-election was called following the resignation of Cllr. Tim Shand.

The by-election was called following the death of Cllr. Ronald Stockbridge.

The by-election was called following the resignation of Cllr. Pete Pattisson.

The by-election was called following the resignation of Cllr. Joseph K. Folorunso.

2014–2018

The by-election was called following the resignation of Councillor Ami Ibitson.

Brockley by-election (October 2016) – Labour hold
Evelyn by-election (October 2016) – Labour hold

2018–2019

The by-election was called following the resignation of Councillor Alex Feis-Bryce.

The by-election was called following the resignation of Councillor Janet Daby.

2021 by-elections 
Four wards held by-elections alongside the 2021 local elections.

Election results 2002–2018
In 2002 the council was reduced to its smallest size ever: 18 wards of 3 councillors each, plus an Elected Mayor, an innovation introduced by the Government two years earlier in the Local Government Act 2000. Incumbent Dave Sullivan who was combining the roles of Civic Mayor and Leader of the Council, in preparation for the introduction of the new system lost an acrimonious Labour Party internal primary to Steve Bullock, who went on to win the position. However, local policy difficulties as well as the problems the Labour Party was experiencing nationally meant that the 2006 election turned out to be only the second time that Labour didn't win a majority of councillors. In 2014, with an unpopular coalition government in national office, Labour regained almost all seats on the council, with the only opposition being a single Green. In 2018 Labour won every seat for the first time.

2018 Council:
Labour 54*

2014 Council:
Labour 53*; Green 1

2010 Council:
Labour 40*; Liberal Democrats 12; Green 1; Conservative 2

2006 Council:
Labour 27*; Liberal Democrats 17; Green 6; Conservative 3; Socialist 2

2002 Council:
Labour 46*; Liberal Democrats 4; Conservative 2; Socialist 1; Green 1; Local Education Action for Parents (LEAP) 1

*including Elected Mayor

By-elections in the 2002 council
(winning party shown)

17 March 2005 – Forest Hill (Lib Dem)
17 March 2005 – Lee Green (Lib Dem)
10 June 2004 – Evelyn (Labour)
10 June 2004 – Lee Green (Labour)
4 December 2003 – Telegraph Hill (Socialist)
23 October 2003 – Lewisham Central (Lib Dem) [All postal ballot]
7 November 2002 – Downham (Lib Dem)
10 October 2002 – Lee Green (Lib Dem)

By-elections in the 2006 council
(winning party shown)

13 September 2007 – Whitefoot (Lib Dem)
19 February 2009 – 2x Downham (2x Lib Dem)

Election results 1978–1998
In 1978 the council was increased to 67 seats as the ward boundaries were reviewed and changed. Also, the Government changed the law to extend Council terms everywhere from three to four years, so the 1974 council was given an extra year of life.

1998 Council:
Labour 61; Lib Dem 4; Conservative 2

1994 Council:
Labour 63; Lib Dem 3; Conservative 1

1990 Council:
Labour 58; Conservative 6; Lib Dem 3

1986 Council:
Labour 50; Conservative 17

1982 Council:
Labour 43; Conservative 24

1978 Council:
Labour 44; Conservative 23

By-elections in the 1998 council
(winning party shown)
8 November 2001 – Bellingham (Labour)
8 February 2001 – Marlowe (Labour)
23 November 2000 – Pepys (Socialist)
15 July 1999 – Churchdown (Labour)
10 June 1999 – Pepys (Socialist)
8 April 1999 – Downham (Lib Dem)
25 November 1998 – Grinling Gibbons (Labour)

Election results 1964–1974
Between 1964 and 1974 the council was elected on wards created before the borough was created: 18 councillors in 6 wards from the Metropolitan Borough of Deptford and 42 councillors in 17 wards from the Metropolitan Borough of Lewisham. The election of the first council in 1964 constituted the practical creation of the London Borough of Lewisham. It operated in 'shadow' form and did not take over administration of services until a year later. Whilst the term of a council at that time was three years, the Government extended the life of all the London Boroughs in order to de-synchronize the timetabling of elections with those of the Greater London Council.

However, the 1968 council elections were a disaster for the Labour Party who were in national government at the time, and this was reflected in this borough – the three-year period 1968–1971 remains the only time in the borough's existence that Labour has not formed the administration. Non-Labour governance didn't take – the 1971 election saw the Conservative Party unable to defend its gains, as – now in national government itself – it was crushed in turn.

1974 Council:
Labour 49; Conservative 11

1971 Council:
Labour 55; Conservative 5

1968 Council:
Conservative 41; Labour 19

1964 Council:
Labour 45; Conservative 15

References